Paula Balekana (Suva, Fiji, 18 May 1993) is a Fijian rugby union player. His usual position is as a wing, and he currently plays for the New England Free Jacks in Major League Rugby (MLR). He previously played for the Houston SaberCats in MLR.

In 2017, Balekana was named in the Sydney Rays squad having represented Gordon RFC.  and for 2018-19 Pro14 and 2019-20 Pro14 seasons he played for Zebre .

References

External links
It's Rugby Profile
Profile Player

1993 births
Living people
Fijian rugby union players
Houston SaberCats players
Zebre Parma players
Rugby union wings
Sydney (NRC team) players
New England Free Jacks players